Hugh O'Reilly may refer to:

Hugh O'Reilly (Archbishop of Armagh) (c. 1581–1653), Irish Catholic bishop
Hugh O'Reilly (Bishop of Clogher) (1739–1801), Irish Catholic bishop
Hughie O'Reilly, Gaelic football player